Richard Wylly Habersham (December 1786 – December 2, 1842) was an American lawyer from Savannah, Georgia. Habersham graduated from Princeton College in 1810.  He was appointed United States Attorney and served until his resignation in 1825. Running as a Whig, he was elected as a representative from Georgia in the United States House of Representatives from 1839 to 1842 and died in office.  He is interred at Old Cemetery in Clarkesville, Georgia.

See also
List of United States Congress members who died in office (1790–1899)

References

1786 births
1842 deaths
Politicians from Savannah, Georgia
Princeton University alumni
United States Attorneys for the District of Georgia
Whig Party members of the United States House of Representatives from Georgia (U.S. state)
American slave owners
19th-century American politicians